Randolph Township is one of thirteen townships in Tippecanoe County, Indiana, United States. As of the 2010 census, its population was 931 and it contained 352 housing units. As for 2018, the population is estimated to be 1,084.

Geography

Unincorporated communities
 Corwin at 
 Romney at 
(This list is based on USGS data and may include former settlements.)

Adjacent townships
 Wea Township (northeast)
 Lauramie Township (east)
 Madison Township, Montgomery County (southeast)
 Coal Creek Township, Montgomery County (southwest)
 Jackson Township (west)
 Union Township (northwest)

Cemeteries
The township contains these two cemeteries: Elmwood and Mintonye.

Major highways
  US Route 231
  Indiana State Road 28

Airports and landing strips
 Agricultural Seed Airstrip
 Grimes Farm Strip

School districts
 Tippecanoe School Corporation

Political districts
 Indiana's 4th congressional district
 State House District 41
 State Senate District 22

References
 United States Census Bureau 2007 TIGER/Line Shapefiles
 United States Board on Geographic Names (GNIS)
 United States National Atlas

External links
 Indiana Township Association
 United Township Association of Indiana

Townships in Tippecanoe County, Indiana
Lafayette metropolitan area, Indiana
Townships in Indiana